Theodor Holman (born 9 January 1953, in Amsterdam) is a Dutch journalist, presenter, and writer of Indo descent.

He studied Dutch language and History at the University of Amsterdam. He was editor of the satirical student newspaper Propria Cures.

His play Breivik meets Wilders depicts a fictional meeting between Anders Behring Breivik and controversial Dutch lawmaker Geert Wilders at London's Heathrow airport in March 2010. The play was staged at Amsterdam's De Balie theatre. Other plays are currently under development in Sweden and the UK.

Bibliography
Een lekker leven - A nice life (1986)
Apenliefde - Monkeylove (1991)
Familiefeest - Family party (1992)
Hoe ik mijn moeder vermoordde - How I murdered my mother (1999)
Het blijft toch familie - They're still family (2001)

Filmography
Films as screenwriter:
Interview (2003)
Cool! (2004)
Medea (2005)
Oorlogsrust (2006)
Interview (2007)

References

External links

Fansite

1953 births
Dutch columnists
Dutch opinion journalists
Dutch critics
Dutch satirists
Dutch political journalists
20th-century Dutch novelists
20th-century Dutch male writers
21st-century Dutch novelists
Dutch male novelists
Living people
Dutch people of Indonesian descent
Dutch republicans
Writers from Amsterdam
Dutch radio personalities
Dutch screenwriters
Dutch male screenwriters
Dutch television presenters
Indo people
21st-century Dutch male writers